Timm Alexander Herzbruch (born  7 June 1997) is a German field hockey player who plays as a midfielder or forward for Uhlenhorst Mülheim and the Germany national team.

International career
He represented his country at the 2016 Summer Olympics, where he won the bronze medal. In 2018, Herzbruch was nominated for the FIH Rising Star of the Year Award. On 28 May 2021, he was named in the squads for the 2021 EuroHockey Championship and the 2020 Summer Olympics.

References

External links
 
 
 

1997 births
Living people
Sportspeople from Essen
German male field hockey players
Male field hockey midfielders
Male field hockey forwards
Field hockey players at the 2016 Summer Olympics
Field hockey players at the 2020 Summer Olympics
2018 Men's Hockey World Cup players
Olympic field hockey players of Germany
Olympic bronze medalists for Germany
Olympic medalists in field hockey
Medalists at the 2016 Summer Olympics
HTC Uhlenhorst Mülheim players
Men's Feldhockey Bundesliga players
21st-century German people